The siege of Tripoli occurred in 1551 when the Ottoman Turks and Barbary pirates besieged and vanquished the Knights of Malta in the Red Castle of Tripoli, modern Libya. The Spanish had established an outpost in Tripoli in 1510, and Charles V remitted it to the Knights in 1530. The siege culminated in a six-day bombardment and the surrender of the city on 15 August.

The siege of Tripoli was successive to an earlier attack on Malta in July, which was repelled, and the successful invasion of Gozo, in which 5,000 Christian captives were taken and brought on galleys to the location of Tripoli.

Siege

The city was under the command of Fra' Gaspard de Vallier, with thirty knights and 630 Italian and Sicilian mercenaries. The Ottomans had a base since 1531 in the city of Tajura, 20 kilometers to the east, where Khayr al-Din had been based. The Ottomans encircled the fort, and established 3 batteries of 12 guns each.

The French Ambassador to the Ottoman Empire, Gabriel d'Aramon, joined the Ottoman fleet at Tripoli, with two galleys and a galliot, The declared mission of the ambassador was to dissuade the Ottomans from capturing the city, at the request of the Grand Master of Malta, as Malta was not identified as an enemy in the Franco-Ottoman alliance against the Habsburgs. According to later reports, when Sinan Pasha (Sinanüddin Yusuf Pasha) and Dragut refused to lift the siege, on grounds that they were under order to eradicate the Knights of Malta from the African continent, d'Aramon threatened to sail to Constantinople to appeal to Sultan Suleiman, but he was then barred from leaving the city until the end of the siege.

Soon the soldiers in the fort mutinied, and negotiation for surrender started. The city was captured on 15 August 1551 by Sinan Pasha after six days of bombardment. The Knights, many of them French, were returned to Malta upon the intervention of the French ambassador, and shipped on board his galleys, while the mercenaries were enslaved. (some authors say 200 men were freed). Murād Agha, the Ottoman commander of Tajura since 1536, was named as the Pashalik of the city.

Nicolas de Villegagnon, the future explorer of Brazil, was present at the siege of Tripoli in 1551, and wrote an account about it in 1553.

Aftermath

From Malta, d'Aramon wrote a letter about his intervention to Henry II. The role of d'Aramon was widely criticized by Charles V and Julius III on suspicion that he had encouraged the Ottomans to take the city. It appeared that d'Aramon had participated in the victory banquet of the Ottomans, raising further suspicions about his role in the siege, and leading to claims by Charles V that France participated in the siege. In any instance, d'Aramon had a special relationship with the Ottomans, and was clearly aware that the fall of Tripoli represented a major setback for Charles V.

Upon his return to Malta, Gaspard de Vallier was heavily criticized by the Grand Master Juan de Homedes y Coscon who wished to assign all the blame for the defeat on him. He was brought in front of a tribunal, and stripped from the habit and cross of the Order. He had been however staunchly defended by Nicolas de Villegagnon, who exposed the duplicity of de Homedes.

The siege was the first step of the all-out Italian War of 1551–1559 in the European theater, and in the Mediterranean the French galleys of Marseilles were ordered to join the Ottoman fleet.

In 1553, Dragut was nominated commander of Tripoli by Suleiman, making the city an important center for piratical raids in the Mediterranean and the capital of the Ottoman province of Tripolitania. In a famous attack from Tripoli, in 1558, Dragut attacked Reggio, and took all its inhabitants as slaves to Tripoli.

In 1560, a powerful naval force was sent to recapture Tripoli, but that force was defeated in the Battle of Djerba.

See also
 Red Castle of Tripoli
 List of Ottoman sieges and landings
 Franco-Ottoman alliance
 Timeline of Maltese history
 Battle of Tripoli (2011)

Notes

Conflicts in 1551
Tripoli 1551
Tripoli 1551
History of Tripoli, Libya
Suleiman the Magnificent
1551 in Africa
1551 in the Ottoman Empire
Italian War of 1551–1559